Percy Albert Ernest Love (6 October 1899 – 19 May 1976) was a former Australian rules footballer who played with Melbourne in the Victorian Football League (VFL).	Brother of Bob Love.

Notes

External links 

1899 births
1976 deaths
Australian rules footballers from Melbourne
Melbourne Football Club players
Prahran Football Club players
People from South Yarra, Victoria